

List of elections 

|-
| 

| Thomas R. Underwood
|  | Democratic
| 1948
|  | Incumbent resigned March 17, 1951 when appointed U.S. Senator.New member elected April 4, 1951.Democratic hold.
| nowrap | √ John C. Watts (Democratic) 55.3%Otis C. Thomas (Republican) 44.7%

|-
| 
| John Kee
|  | Democratic
| 1932
|  | Incumbent died.New member elected July 17, 1951 (see Widow's succession).Democratic hold.
| nowrap | √ Elizabeth Kee (Democratic) 58.3%Cyrus H. Gadd (Republican) 41.7%

|-
| 
| Frank Buchanan
|  | Democratic
| nowrap | 1946 (Special)
|  | Incumbent died April 27, 1951.New member elected July 24, 1951.Democratic hold.
| nowrap | √ Vera Buchanan (Democratic) 61.1%Clifford W. Flegal (Republican) 38.9%

|-
| 
| Frank Fellows
|  | Republican
| 1940
|  | Incumbent died April 27, 1951.New member elected October 22, 1951.Republican hold.
| nowrap | √ Clifford McIntire (Republican) 65.8%Katherine H. Hickson (Democratic) 27.5%Ralph A. Dyer (Independent) 6.8%

|-
| 
| Harry L. Towe
|  | Republican
| 1942
|  | Incumbent resigned September 7, 1951 to become N.J. Assistant Attorney General.New member elected November 6, 1951.Republican hold.
| nowrap | √ Frank C. Osmers Jr. (Republican) 62.6%Evelyn M. Seufert (Democratic) 37.4%

|-
| 
| Edward G. Breen
|  | Democratic
| 1948
|  | Incumbent resigned October 1, 1951, due to ill health.New member elected November 6, 1951.Republican gain.
| nowrap | √ Paul Schenck (Republican) 55.4%Jesse Yoder (Democratic) 44.6%

|-
| 
| Wilson D. Gillette
|  | Republican
| nowrap | 1941 (Special)
|  | Incumbent died August 7, 1951.New member elected November 6, 1951.Republican hold.
| nowrap | √ Joseph L. Carrigg (Republican) 64.3%Paul Harris (Democratic) 35.7%

|-
| 
| Albert C. Vaughn
|  | Republican
| 1950
|  | Incumbent died September 1, 1951.New member elected November 6, 1951.Republican hold.
| nowrap | √ Karl C. King (Republican) unopposed

|-
| 
| Karl Stefan
|  | Republican
| 1934
|  | Incumbent died August 7, 1951.New member elected December 4, 1951.Republican hold.
| nowrap | √ Bob Harrison (Republican) 70.6%Carl F. Olson (Democratic) 29.4%

|}

See also 
 List of special elections to the United States House of Representatives

 
1951